The Château du Grand Coudray is a private chateau located about  from Villaines-la-Juhel in the Mayenne departement of France.

References 

Châteaux in Mayenne